The year 2007 in speed skating also includes events in the autumn of 2006, since they belong to the same long track speed skating season.

Chronology

 3 November: On the starting day of the Dutch Single Distance Championships, Gianni Romme confirms that he quits as active speed skater to take over as coach of Anni Friesinger.
 17 December: After the Norwegian Championships at Geithus, Norwegian allround champion Mari Hemmer is not selected for the European Championship, as the Norwegian Speed Skating Federation decides they will not use their allotted quota of three skaters. After two days, the decision is changed, and Hemmer, along with Hedvig Bjelkevik (who later declined the place) were selected.
 25 December: Sprinter Erben Wennemars wins bronze at his first start at the Dutch Allround Championships after lowering his personal best on the 10000 m by nearly 20 seconds. Sven Kramer won the championship.
 28 December: Five-time medallist at the Turin Olympics, Cindy Klassen, begins the season by winning two gold medals and three silver medals at the Canadian Single Distance Championships.
 30 December: Anni Friesinger wins four of four distances at the German Allround Championships, but declines a spot at the European Championship. The five-time European Champion will take part at the World Sprint Championship, which she is yet to win, instead.
 9–11 March: Martina Sáblíková wins two gold medals at the 2007 World Single Distance Speed Skating Championships in Salt Lake City on 3000 m and 5000 m tracks and sets a new 5000 m world record for 6:45.61.

International championships

 European: Ritten Artificial Ice Track, Collalbo, Italy, 13 and 14 January
 World Sprint: Vikingskipet, Hamar, Norway, 20 and 21 January
 World Allround: Thialf, Heerenveen, Netherlands, 9–11 February
 World Junior: Olympia Eisstadion, Innsbruck, Austria: 23–25 February
 World Single Distance: Utah Olympic Oval, Salt Lake City, United States, 8–11 March

Other international competitions

 2007 Speed Skating World Cup

 2007 Winter Asian Games, Changchun, China: 28 January – 4 February
 2007 Winter Universiade, Oval Lingotto, Turin, Italy: 17–27 January
 American/Oceanian Regional Qualifier for World Allround Championships, Pettit National Ice Center, Milwaukee: 13 January and 14 February

National championships

Championships need to have at least three participants to be mentioned here. Top three are mentioned for allround and sprint championships if the nation has at least three spots in the relevant international championship, otherwise only the winner is mentioned. If the championship had fewer than three participants, it is not mentioned.

Sweden
 Swedish Championships: Östermalms IP, Stockholm, 15–17 December
 Allround, 15 and 16 December

 Sprint, 16 and 17 December

 Team pursuit, 17 December

Switzerland
 Allround:  Olympia Eisstadion, Innsbruck, Austria, 16 and 17 December

 United States
 Single Distance (Fall World Cup Qualifier): Pettit National Ice Center, Milwaukee, Wisconsin, 19–22 October

 USA Championships: Pettit National Ice Center, Milwaukee, Wisconsin, 19–23 December
Allround, 19 and 20 December

References
 ISU: Speed Skating Events 2006/07
  DESG – Ergebnisse
 Skateresults.com – Season overview 2006/2007 

 
Speed skating by year